Little Rapid River may refer to:

Little Rapid River (Michigan)
Little Rapid River (Ontario)
Little Rapid River (Tasmania), a tributary of Rapid River, Tasmania

See also

 Rapid River (disambiguation)